is a novel by Japanese author Natsume Sōseki. It was serialized in Asahi Shimbun newspaper from December 6, 1912 to November 5, 1913. The novel has been translated into English by Beongcheon Yu.

Popular culture
In the 2013 anime film  written, directed and edited by Makoto Shinkai, the main character Yukari Yukino can be seen reading Kōjin (The Wayfarer).

External links
The complete text of Kojin in Japanese.

1912 novels
Novels by Natsume Sōseki
Novels first published in serial form
Works originally published in Asahi Shimbun